Woodrow Wilson Goode could refer to: 

Woodrow Wilson Goode Sr. (born 1938), former mayor of Philadelphia, Pennsylvania
Woodrow Wilson Goode Jr. (born 1965), former member of the Philadelphia City Council and son of Woodrow Wilson Goode Sr.